Acrapex rhabdoneura is a species of moth of the family Noctuidae first described by George Hampson in 1910. It is found in Africa, including Kenya.

The wingspan is 22–26 mm.

Description
Head, thorax, and abdomen pale ochreous slightly tinged with rufous; palpi dark brown. Forewing pale ochreous slightly irrorated (sprinkled) with brown; the costal edge and interspaces of costal area suffused with reddish brown; a diffused red-brown fascia in and below cell to near termen where it meets an oblique brown fascia from termen below apex to vein 2 with a pale oblique fascia before it from apex; a white streak on extremity of median nervure slightly hooked on discocellulars; the veins beyond the cell streaked with white to the subterminal fascia; a fine red-brown terminal line; cilia brown mixed with ochreous. Hindwing pure white; the underside with the costal area tinged with ochreous.

References

Xyleninae
Moths of Africa
Moths described in 1910